The ninth Connecticut House of Representatives district elects one member of the Connecticut House of Representatives. Its current representative is Jason Rojas. The district consists of parts of the cities of East Hartford and  Manchester and parts of the town of Glastonbury.

List of representatives

Recent elections

External links 
 Google Maps - Connecticut House Districts

References

09
Glastonbury, Connecticut
Manchester, Connecticut
East Hartford, Connecticut